Harry Dupain (19 August 1889 – 29 September 1959) was an Australian cricketer. He played three first-class matches for New South Wales between 1927/28 and 1929/30.

See also
 List of New South Wales representative cricketers

References

External links
 

1889 births
1959 deaths
Australian cricketers
New South Wales cricketers
Cricketers from Sydney